C1 Advanced, previously known as Cambridge English: Advanced and the Certificate in Advanced English (CAE), is an English language examination provided by Cambridge Assessment English (previously known as Cambridge English Language Assessment and University of Cambridge ESOL examination).
 
C1 Advanced looks to prove high-level achievement in English, and is designed for learners preparing for universities or professional life. It is focused on Level C1 of the Common European Framework of Reference for Languages (CEFR).

C1 Advanced is one of the examinations in Cambridge English Qualifications. Each Cambridge English Qualification targets a particular level of the CEFR.

History
C1 Advanced was developed in response to feedback from language centres that there was too great a gap between the qualifications now known as B2 First and C2 Proficiency.

C1 Advanced was designed to allow learners to gain certification for advanced levels of English suitable for use in academic and professional life and was developed using a socio-cognitive approach – that is, it encourages languages skills for use in real-life situations.

Following the launch of the exam, the qualification has been continuously updated to reflect changes in language teaching and assessment. The most recent updates took place in 2015. The main differences are: the overall exam is now 45 minutes shorter; there are four exam papers, instead of five; the Reading and Use of English papers have been combined into a single paper, and there are some new testing focuses and task types. Further information can be found in the revised Exam Specification.

Format

C1 Advanced is made up of four the exam papers, which cover all the key language skills (Reading and Use of Language, Writing, Listening and Speaking).

The Speaking paper is taken face-to-face. Candidates have the choice of taking the Reading and Use of English paper, Writing paper and Listening paper on either a computer or on paper.

1. Reading and Use of English (1 hour 30 minutes)
The Reading and Use of English paper has eight parts and 56 questions. The paper contains texts totalling approximately 3,000 to 3,500 words and candidates are expected to be able to understand texts taken from a range of sources such as short stories, novels, magazines, newspapers and internet articles.

Parts 1 to 3 involve completing gaps in a text (i.e. choosing/forming the correct word for each gap). These questions test knowledge of vocabulary and grammar.

Each question in Part 4 has a sentence and a ‘key’ word, which must be used to complete a second sentence so that it has the same meaning as the first sentence. These key word transformations test grammar, vocabulary and collocation.

Part 5 involves answering multiple-choice questions about a text, with candidates expected to be able to read a text for detail, opinion, tone, purpose, main idea, implication and attitude.

Part 6 has four short texts and cross-text multiple-matching questions, with candidates expected to understand and compare opinions and attitudes across texts.

Part 7 involves choosing paragraphs to fill the gaps in a text, with candidates expected to demonstrate understanding of the structure and development of a text.

Part 8 has a text or several short texts and a series of multiple-matching questions, with candidates expected to demonstrate reading for specific information, detail, opinion and attitude.

2. Writing (1 hour 30 minutes)

The Writing paper has two parts. Candidates are assessed using the following criteria: Content, Communicative Achievement, Organisation, and Language.

The first part is compulsory and involves writing an essay in response to an input text. The input texts might include articles, leaflets, notices and formal or informal letters.

In the second part, candidates must choose one of three writing tasks. These might include writing a letter, proposal, report or review.

3. Listening (approximately 40 minutes)

The Listening paper has 30 questions, which include listening to short extracts, a long monologue, an interview or discussion, and short monologues on a particular theme.

Candidates are expected to demonstrate a wide range of listening skills needed for real-life purposes, such as understanding the gist of an extract, understanding specific information or the speakers’ opinion, attitude or feeling. Recordings take the form of lectures, talks, interviews, speeches and radio broadcasts.

4. Speaking (15 minutes)

The Speaking test is taken face-to-face (including in the computer-based version of the exam) and the standard format is two candidates and two examiners. One examiner acts as interlocutor and assessor, interacting with the candidates and managing the test. The other acts as assessor and does not join in the conversation. Candidates speak alone (monologue), with the interlocutor, and with the other candidate.

Candidates are expected to demonstrate a range of speaking skills such as pronunciation, intonation, initiation and maintaining of a discussion, ability to organise thoughts and use of appropriate grammar and vocabulary.

The Speaking paper is conducted in four parts.

The first part involves a brief exchange between each candidate and the interlocutor.
 
The second part involves each candidate talking in turn, on their own, about a set of pictures.

In the third part the candidates are given some pictures and a task; they are expected to discuss the task, exchange ideas and reach a decision through negotiation.

In the fourth part of the test the candidates and the interlocutor discuss topics related to the task in Part 3. The interlocutor directs the interaction by asking questions which encourage the candidates to discuss issues in more depth than in earlier parts of the test.

Scoring

In January 2015, Cambridge English Scale scores replaced the candidate profile and standardised scores used for pre-2015 results. All candidates (pre- and post-2015) receive a Statement of Results, with those scoring high enough also receiving a certificate.

Scoring from January 2015

From 2015, the Statement of Results and the Certificate have the following information about the candidate’s performance: 
 A score on the Cambridge English Scale for each skill (Reading, Writing, Listening and Speaking) and for Use of English
 A score on the Cambridge English Scale for the overall exam
 A grade (A, B, C, Level B2) for the overall exam
 A CEFR level for the overall exam.

The certificate also contains the UK National Qualifications Framework (NQF) level.

The candidate’s overall score is averaged from the individual scores for each skill (Reading, Writing, Listening and Speaking) and for Use of English.

C1 Advanced is targeted at CEFR Level C1, but also provides reliable assessment at the level above C1 (Level C2) and the level below (B2). The following scores are used to report results:

Scores between 142 and 159 are also reported on the Statement of Results but candidates will not receive a certificate.

Scoring pre-2015

Pre-2015, the Statement of Results had the following information, reflecting the total combined score from all four papers: 
 A grade (A, B, C, Level B2) for the overall exam
 A score (out of 100) for the overall exam
 A CEFR level for the overall exam.

Pre-2015, the Statement of Results also had a Candidate Profile, which showed the candidate’s performance on each of the individual papers against the following scale: exceptional, good, borderline and weak.

Pre-2015, candidates who achieved a score of 45 or more (out of 100) received a certificate.

Timing and results

Candidates take the Reading and Use of English, Writing and Listening papers on the same day. The Speaking paper is usually taken a few days before or after the other papers, or on the same day.

The paper-based exam and computer-based exam are offered at test centres throughout the calendar year. A directory of all global exam centres and their contact details can be accessed on the Cambridge Assessment English website.

Successful candidates receive two documents: a Statement of Results and a Certificate. Universities, employers and other organisations may require either of these documents as proof of English language skills.

An online Statement of Results is available to candidates who have sat the computer-based exam two weeks after the exam and to candidates of the paper-based exam approximately four weeks after the exam. Successful candidates (those scoring above 160 on the Cambridge English Scale) will receive a hard copy certificate within three months of the exam.

Holders of a C1 Advanced certificate display similar language ability to candidates who have an IELTS score of 6.5 to 8.0. The following table demonstrates a comparison of Cambridge English Scale scores, as used by C1 Advanced, with IELTS band scores.

Usage

C1 Advanced is used for study, work and immigration purposes. It is designed to demonstrate that a candidate has achieved a high level of English ability which can be used in academic and professional contexts.

C1 Advanced is accepted globally by over 6,000  institutions. Many higher education institutions accept C1 Advanced for admission purposes. These include universities based in:
 Australia (e.g. Monash University)
 Canada (e.g. University of Toronto)
 France (e.g. ICN Business School)
 Germany (e.g. Ludwig-Maximilians-Universität München)
 Hong Kong (e.g. The Hong Kong University of Science and Technology)
 Italy (e.g. Politecnico di Milano)
 Japan (e.g. University of Tokyo)
 Spain (e.g. Universidad Carlos III de Madrid)
 Switzerland (e.g. Swiss Federal Institute of Technology in Zurich/ETH Zürich)
 UK (e.g. University of Oxford)
 USA (e.g. University of Virginia).

A full list of organisations can be accessed on the Cambridge Assessment English website.

C1 Advanced and C2 Proficiency can be used to apply for degree courses (or higher) at almost all UK universities.  This is because candidates who need to apply for a visa to study at degree level or above at a Tier 4 Sponsor only need to meet the English language requirements set by the university; they don’t need to take a test from the UKVI list of Secure English Language Tests (SELT tests).

In some countries, students with a C1 Advanced certificate gain exemption from the English components of school-leaving exams.

C1 Advanced can be used for visa purposes, with recognition by the Australian Department of Immigration and Border Protection (DIBP, formerly DIAC) for student visas. DIBP has extended the recognition of C1 Advanced and they will now accept scores in the exam for Temporary Graduate, Skilled, Former Resident, and Work and Holiday visa.

C1 Advanced is also recognised by global employers, such as Accenture, Adecco, Airbus, American Express, AstraZeneca, Bayer, Boehringer Ingelheim, Bosch, Citibank, Credit Suisse, Dell, Deloitte, Deutsche Bank, DHL, Ericsson, Ernst & Young, Estée Lauder, HSBC, IBM, KPMG, Lufthansa, Manpower, McKinsey & Company, Merrill Lynch, Motorola, Nestlé, Nokia, OMEGA, Orange, PricewaterhouseCoopers, Reckitt Benckiser, Reuters, Saint-Gobain and Sony.

Many institutions accept more than one English language exam, e.g. C1 Advanced and IELTS. However, there are some subtle differences between these two exams. For example, C1 Advanced certifies at B2, C1 and C2 levels – the language levels needed for study and work; IELTS is designed to test a much broader range of language levels, from CEFR Level A1 up to C2.

Preparation
A comprehensive list of authorised exam centres can be found on the Cambridge Assessment English website. Free preparation materials, such as sample tests, are available from the website for C1 Advanced. There is also a wide range of official support materials, jointly developed by Cambridge Assessment English and Cambridge University Press.

See also
 Cambridge Assessment English
 Cambridge English Qualifications
 A2 Key
 B1 Preliminary
 B2 First
 C2 Proficiency

References

External links
 

Standardized tests for English language
English-language education
English language tests
University of Cambridge examinations

de:Cambridge ESOL#Allgemeines Englisch